A by-election was held on 29 June 1957, with nomination day occurring on 18 May 1957 in the Cairnhill, and Tanjong Pagar constituency. When talks with the British authorities for self-governance broke down, Chief Minister David Marshall decided to resign from the Labour Front on 7 June 1956. Marshall had also challenged opposition leader Lee Kuan Yew from the People's Action Party to resign and recontest his Tanjong Pagar constituency as well, which he did. 

The Labour Front's replacement candidate Keng Bang Ee lost the seat to the new Liberal Socialist Party, while Lee retained his seat in Tanjong Pagar.

The by-election had a voter turnout of merely 43.55%, the lowest of any elections during the period between 1948 and 1959. With the introduction of compulsory voting in 1959, the turnout of 43.55% remains the lowest for any elections in Singapore's history.

Election Deposit
The election deposit was stated at $500.

Results

Cairnhill

Note 1: As Mirza Abdul Majid had failed to secure 12.5% of the votes, he had his election deposit forfeited.

Note 2: In 1957, Singapore Malay Union (SMU) was expelled by its alliance partners consisted of UMNO and MCA for fielding a candidate in this by-election which was the reason for the elections department of Singapore to view Tengku Muda as another independent candidate.

Tanjong Pagar

References
Background of Singaporean 1957 By election
1957 By election's result
Brief History on Singapore Malay Union (Dissolved in 1960s)

1957
1957 elections in Asia
June 1957 events in Asia
1957 in Singapore